Audio program may refer to:

Audiobook
Music album
Radio program
Secondary audio program, an alternative soundtrack on MTS stereo TV technology

See also
:Category:Audio software
Video program
Audio Bible